Nele Hagener (born 6 February 1976) is a German equestrian. She competed in the team eventing at the 2000 Summer Olympics.

References

External links
 

1976 births
Living people
German female equestrians
Olympic equestrians of Germany
Equestrians at the 2000 Summer Olympics
Sportspeople from Hamburg